Andreas Steindl (born 8 April 1989) is a Swiss mountain climber, ski mountaineer and mountain guide.

Steindl was born in Zermatt, where he worked as a carpenter before he earned his mountain guide diploma in 2011. He also competes in alpine skiing and mountain running events.

Selected results

Mountaineering 
On 23 August 2011 he climbed the Matterhorn in a record time of 2 hours 57 minutes, and beat the record of Simon Anthamatten, Ernest Farquet, Marcel Marti and Florent Troillet from 2007. The team of 2007 mounted the Matterhorn in a time of 3 hours 45 minutes.

Ski mountaineering 
 2011:
 4th, Zermatt-Rothorn mountain run
 2012:
 6th, European Championship, sprintSteindl also competed in the espoir class at the European Championship, and won Bronze in the youth sprint event.

Running 
 2011: 3rd (juniors), Matterhorn run

References 

1989 births
Living people
People from Zermatt
Swiss male ski mountaineers
Swiss mountain climbers
Sportspeople from Valais